Yangshan Port (Chinese: , p Yángshān Gǎng, Wu Yan-se Kaon), formally the Yangshan Deep-Water Port (p Yángshān Shēnshuǐ Gǎng, Wu Yan-se Sen-sy Kaon), is a deep water port for container ships in Hangzhou Bay south of Shanghai. The port is part of the Maritime Silk Road. The port is built on the islands of Greater and Lesser Yangshan, part of the Zhoushan archipelago, with fill from land reclamation. Connected to Shanghai's Pudong New Area by the Donghai Bridge and forming part of the Port of Shanghai, the islands of Greater and Lesser Yangshan are administered separately as part of Zhejiang's Shengsi County.

In mid-2011, port officials said the port was on track to move 12.3 million Twenty-foot equivalent units (TEUs) during the year, up from 10.1 million TEUs in 2010. In 2015, the port handled 36.54 million TEUs, and by 2019, its throughput had increased to 43.35 million TEU.

Construction phases
In 2000 and 2001, the decision was made to commence construction on the first of four phases. The first two phases have nine berths in total along a  quayside. The first phase, which opened in 2004, can accommodate 2.2 million containers annually and includes 10 quay cranes. The second phase was opened in December 2006, and comprises  with 15 quay cranes. The third phase, opened in stages, was completed in 2010 with seven berths.
The fourth phase, which began trial operation on Dec. 10, 2017, will add 4 million Twenty-foot equivalent units (TEUs) to the port's annual capacity.

The total cost of building the port may reach US$12 billion over 20 years.
When complete, the port will have 30 berths capable of handling 15 million TEUs annually.

Highway access

The Yangshan Port is connected to the mainland via the  Donghai Bridge, opened on 1 December 2005 as the world's longest sea bridge. The six-lane highway bridge took 6,000 workers two and half years to construct.

Rail access
There is no direct railway connection to the Yangshan Port. The port is served by Luchaogang railway station on the Pudong Railway, which was opened in 2005 near the mainland end of the Donghai Bridge.

See also 

 Donghai Bridge
 Donghai Bridge Wind Farm
 Port of Shanghai

References

External links
National Geographic: Megastructures has an episode about the port

Ports and harbours of China
Transport in Shanghai
Islands of Shanghai